Lee Hysan or Lee Hy-san (1879 – 30 April 1928) was a Hong Kong businessman who was involved in the opium trade and refinery, as well as land development in British Hong Kong during the early 1900s. He was nicknamed the Opium King in Hong Kong and Macau.

Early life 
Lee was born in Hawaii. Lee's father was Lee Leung-yik, a businessman who was heavily involved in the opium business in Hong Kong and China. Lee's ancestral home was Kaiping, China, and Lee Leung-yik immigrated and moved his family to the US during the California Gold Rush at age 49 when immigration from Qing-era China was illegal. After making a small fortune, the family left San Francisco in 1896 and eventually relocated to Xinhui, Guangdong Province and then to Hong Kong.

At age seventeen, after arriving in Hong Kong. Lee Hysan continued his studies at Queen's College. Since he spoke English fluently, he later taught English at Queen's College, his alma mater.

Career 
Lee's father achieved great wealth from the opium trade, and Lee inherited his father's business. Having amassed a great fortune from his successful opium business, Lee later participated in the fast-growing Hong Kong real estate market.

In 1923, he bought the Jardine's Hill property, west of Causeway Bay, from Jardines for HK$3.8 million. He initially wanted to build opium refinery facilities there, but owing to the global anti-opium movement, he changed his plan and developed the property as Lee Garden.  It is approximately the area around Lee Garden Road, Lee Theatre, Yun Ping Road and Percival Street.

Children 
In March 1905, Lee's son Richard Charles Lee was born in Hong Kong. In December 1924, Lee's son Jung Kong Lee was also born in Hong Kong.

Death and legacy 
On 30 April 1928, Lee was shot on a street in the Central district in Hong Kong and died shortly after yelling for help. The assassination was possibly due to a growing public resentment of his opium business, which people believed had caused great harm to Chinese society. The assassin was never caught, despite his family offering a huge bounty.

At the time of his death, his estate was valued at HK$4.4 million. The present-day Hysan Development Company has a market capitalisation in excess of HK$20 billion.

Landmarks named after him 
 Lee Garden
 Lee Garden One
 Lee Garden Two
 Lee Garden Three
 Lee Garden Five
 Lee Garden Six
 
 Hysan Place
 Lee Hysan Hall in the University of Hong Kong
 Lee Hysan Medical Library in the University of Hong Kong, renamed as Yu Chun Keung Medical Library after moving
 Lee Hysan Concert Hall in Chinese University of Hong Kong

Doggerel 
There was a popular doggerel in Hong Kong showing Lee's notoriety. The first characters of the first three lines sound (in Cantonese) almost the same as Lee's name:
利己害人 lei6 gei2 hoi6 jan4
欺貧重富 hei1 pan4 zung6 fu3
神憎鬼厭 san4 zang1 gwai2 jim3
街知巷聞 gaai1 zi1 hong6 man4
Literal translation:
Benefiting oneself while harming others,
Oppressing the poor while respecting the rich.
Detested by the deities and disgusted by the ghosts,
Known on the streets and heard on the alleys.

Notable relatives 
Many of Lee's descendants and other family members are notable in their own right:

 Richard Charles Lee (利銘澤) (1905-1983) - businessman, son of Lee Hysan
 Vivienne Poy née Lee (利德蕙) - daughter of Richard Charles Lee and a Canadian Senator from 1998 to 2012
 Harold Hsiao-Wo Lee (利孝和)
 Jung Kong Lee (利榮康) - chemist, son of Lee Hysan
 Lee Quo-wei (利國偉) - banker and educator, nephew of Lee Hysan
 Peter Ting Chang Lee, JP (deceased) - former Chairman of Hysan Development
 Michael Tze Hau Lee, BA, MBA - Managing Director, Hysan Development Company Limited
 Anthony Hsien Pin Lee, BA, MBA - non-managing director, Hysan Development Company Limited
 Chien Lee - non-executive director, Hysan Development Company Limited
 Dr. Deanna Ruth Tak Yung Rudgard, BA, MD - non-executive director, Hysan Development Company Limited

Further reading

References

Hong Kong businesspeople
1928 deaths
1879 births
Assassinated Hong Kong people
People murdered in Hong Kong
Businesspeople from Hawaii
Opium in China
Hawaii people of Chinese descent
1928 in Hong Kong
1928 crimes in Hong Kong
1928 murders in Asia
1920s murders in Hong Kong
Alumni of Queen's College, Hong Kong
American emigrants to China